The Information Bureau of the Communist and Workers' Parties, commonly known as Cominform, was a co-ordination body of Marxist-Leninist communist parties in Europe during the early Cold War that was formed in part as a replacement of the Communist International. The Cominform was dissolved during de-Stalinization in 1956.

Overview

Establishment and purpose
The Information Bureau of the Communist and Workers' Parties was unofficially founded at a conference of Marxist–Leninist communist parties from across Europe in Szklarska Poręba, Poland in September 1947. Joseph Stalin, the leader of the Soviet Union, called the conference in response to divergences among communist governments on whether or not to attend the Paris Conference on the Marshall Plan in July 1947. It was founded with nine members: the Communist Party of the Soviet Union, the Bulgarian Communist Party, the Communist Party of Czechoslovakia, the Hungarian Communist Party, the Polish Workers' Party, the Romanian Communist Party, the Communist Party of Yugoslavia, the French Communist Party, and the Italian Communist Party. The organization was commonly known as Cominform, an abbreviated form of the Communist Information Bureau, itself a shortened version of the official name. 

Cominform was officially established on 5 October 1947 with the intended purpose of coordinating actions between European communist parties under the direction of the Soviet Union. Cominform was not intended to be a replacement or successor to the Comintern, the international organization that advocated world communism and dissolved in 1943, but was considered a type of successor. However starting in 1950, Stalin started to push for the Cominform's functions to be expanded greatly, almost to the scale of the Comintern. This push ceased after his death. Cominform was not a world communist party and did not have subordinates or power, limiting itself to its newspaper, For Lasting Peace, for People's Democracy! published in several languages, and to one goal: "to organize an exchange of experience, and where necessary to coordinate the activity of the Communist parties, on the basis of mutual agreement." A vast array of articles was published, including some not published by members such as the Canadian Communist Party. Cominform was to organize the propagation of communist interests and repel the expansion of anti-communism in the aftermath of World War II and the subsequent Cold War, dividing the world (per the Zhdanov Doctrine) into imperialist and anti-imperialist factions.  The French and Italian communist parties were specifically tasked by Cominform with the obstruction of the implementation of the Marshall Plan and the Truman Doctrine in Western Europe. From a global standpoint the Cominform strived/ventured to unite the Communist parties against the copious policies which threatened to empower Western Europe to oppose communism, mainly through pinpointing/underlining the importance of national independence and peace. More important though was the fact that the Cominform had to remain small in size (Eurocentric Organization), in order to preserve its maneuverability and efficient centralisation, mainly due to the fact that it operated as a propaganda tool controlled by the International Communist movement to instruct and inform the leading members of the different national parties. Its members were communist parties and as such, would guarantee the safeguard the monolith of the communist movement. The primary reason for the Communist Party of Greece not being a member was fears of western powers using this to paint the KKE as foreign insurgents. Although they did contribute to Cominform publications. Because of the Chinese Civil War, the Communist Party of China was also not invited for a similar reason as Greece. The Communist Party of China nonetheless adhered to Cominform policy. In a conversation with Liu Shaoqi, Stalin indicated that he was not opposed to China joining the Cominform, only that it was unnecessary at the present time. There were plans for China to lead an Asian Cominform of some sort, but this idea was seemingly forgotten with the death of Stalin and weakening of the Cominform.

Expulsion of Yugoslavia
Cominform was initially located in Belgrade, Yugoslavia, but after the Tito–Stalin split expelled Yugoslavia from the group in June 1948, the seat was moved to Bucharest, Romania. Officially, Yugoslavia was expelled for "Titoism" and anti-Sovietism, based on accusations of deviating from Marxism-Leninism. Yugoslavia was considered to be heretical for resisting Soviet dominance in its affairs and integration into Eastern Bloc as a Soviet satellite state. It's believed that one of the most decisive factors that led to the expulsion of Yugoslavia was their commitment to supporting communist insurgents in the Greek Civil War, in violation of the "Percentages agreement" between the Soviet Union and United Kingdom, and their decision to station troops in Albania. However, this was not the official line of reasoning from the USSR. In fact, Cominform publications accused Yugoslavia of supporting the anti-communist insurgents in the Greek Civil War. The expulsion of the Communist Party of Yugoslavia from Cominform initiated the Informbiro period in Yugoslavia's history. Cominform's newspaper was originally printed in Belgrade; it was moved to Bucharest after the expulsion of Yugoslavia.

Dissolution
From 1950, Cominform became rapidly irrelevant after the victory of the People's Republic of China in the Chinese Civil War weakened Europe as the center of communism. Cominform, composed of entirely European parties, was rendered largely useless in Soviet influence over the international communist movement. No attempts were made to reorganize Cominform and its decline accelerated drastically after the death of Stalin in March 1953. Meanwhile, the Soviets had gradually replaced Cominform with more effective and specialized organizations to exert their influence, such the Council for Mutual Economic Assistance (COMECON) in 1949 and the Warsaw Pact in 1955. Cominform was officially dissolved on 17 April 1956 in a decision by the Central Committee of the CPSU, prompted by the Soviet rapprochement with Yugoslavia and the De-Stalinization process following the rise of Nikita Khrushchev as Stalin's successor.

Meetings 
There are four recorded meetings of the Cominform, before 1956.

Founding meeting 
This founding meeting took place on 22-23 September 1947 in Jelenia Góra, Poland. Members present at the first meeting were Kardelj and Djilas for Yugoslavia, Chervenkov and Poptomov for Bulgaria, Gheorghiu-Dej and Anna Pauker for Romania, Farkas and Revai for Hungary, Gomułka and Minc for Poland, Zhdanov and Malenkov for the U.S.S.R., Duclos and Fajon for France, Slánský and Bašťovanský for Czechoslovakia, and Longo and Reale for Italy. Zhdanov was chairman, Gomulka was appointed vice-chairman.  Gomulka's was given the task of making the first report, titled "On the interchange of experience and co-ordination", with the second being Zhdanov's report on the global status quo. In the report "On co-ordination", the key points, apart from Poland's evaluation, seem to be criticisms of the French and Italian communist parties after the emancipation, due to their missing the opportunity to seize power, contrary to the  Eastern Europeans, who proved their political superiority by quickly dealing with the issue of ensuring their dominance on the government. The significance of this criticism is shown by the regret of the French and Italian representatives, accompanied by the following statement in the final resolution: "the need for interchange and voluntary co-ordination of action in the various parties is particularly keenly felt at the present time". Zhdanov's report has been of critical importance to the communist ideology.  After mentioning the original disbandment of the Communist International in May 1943, Zhdanov pointed out the fact that "the present position of the communist parties had its shortcomings. [...] The need for mutual consultation and voluntary co-ordination had become particularly urgent at the present juncture". Reason to this, according to Zhdanov, can be found in the new global state, which has led to new tasks passed down to the communist parties of the new democratic states, as well as the "fraternal communist parties of France, Italy, Great Britain and other countries". Furthermore, given that the dissolution of the Comintern had been understood by some people as the subsequent elimination of all ties, "continued isolation may lead to a slackening of mutual understanding and at times even to serious blunders". The first part of Zhdanov's report was included in a published declaration, which designates the task of the communist parties as "taking into their hands the banner of defense of national independence and sovereignty of their countries". The following part, in combination with Gomulka's report, formed the preamble of the resolution, which underlined the following five key points; 1) that an Information Bureau should be established, which would consist of spokesmen of the nine participating communist parties, 2) that it should be assigned the task of interchanging information and coordination, if need be, 3) that the Bureau should consist of two delegates from each of the nine parties, 4) that the Bureau should produce a journal, which at first would be published every two weeks, and weekly after a while, 5) that the Bureau should be situated in Belgrade, Yugoslavia. But the two Western communist parties (the French and the Italian) were assigned with two tasks, which were; 1) to claim the leadership of their countries once again and prepare for a fierce fight, and 2) take necessary measures to ensure that the "American Policy" would not be implemented in Western Europe, whatever those measures were. Their ineffective policy had to be changed into a policy of strikes, mass-action and sabotage. The first general "attack" was launched in France on 18 November 1947, and in Italy on 12 November. Both turned out to be quite violent. But the wave of attacks ended by the end of the year, due to the fact that the workers had failed to carry out the communist instructions and the two communist parties were not willing to continue the fight. Strikes continued to be carried out sporadically, but without the support of the public.

Second meeting 
The second meeting occurred in Belgrade on 1 February 1948. During this meeting, a permanent editorial board was chosen for the newspaper "For a Lasting Peace, for a People's Democracy!", which was first issued in Belgrade on 1 November 1947. This editorial board was under the leadership of Pavel Yudin. He was succeeded by Mark Mitin, after the Yugoslav expulsion.

Third meeting 
A third meeting occurred in Romania on 28 June 1948. This resulted in the expulsion of the Yugoslav Communist Party. It also led to the relocation of the Cominform's headquarters to Bucharest and initiated the great campaign of transforming the programs and cadres of the Eastern European communist parties. In a unanimous resolution, the eight communist parties agreed that the Yugoslavian communist party had "pursued an incorrect line on the main questions of home and foreign policy, a line appropriate only to nationalism, and which represented a departure from Marxism-Leninism". They approved the actions of the Russian communist party and condemned Yugoslavia's agricultural policy, which sidelined the class differentiation, "regarding the individual peasantry as a single entity and even asserting that the peasantry was the most stable foundation of their state" - a role meant for the proletariat. Since Yugoslavia refused to abide by the Cominform's discipline and ignored its criticism, they had receded from the "family of fraternal communist parties". Anything that Tito could have "infected" was meant to be eliminated. The decisive action against him had been agreed upon by the end of June. At the beginning of July, two of the communist parties, namely the Polish and the Bulgarian one, were summoned to reconsider their ideology. Gomułka, Kostov, Rajk, Markos and Xoxe immediately aroused suspicion. On 6 July 1948, a meeting of the Plenum of the Central Committee of the Polish Workers' Party was set up to carry out a discussion about the considerable deviations of Gomułka. Zadawski and Zamborovski presented a "clear Marxist-Leninist analysis". The Plenum met again on 31 August – 3 September. Gomułka agreed to his wrongdoings and was replaced by Minc. Gomułka was arrested, set free then re-incarcerated. On 12–13 July 1948 the Central Committee of the Bulgarian communist party "unanimously declared that the leadership of our party has never doubted the leading role played by the Russian communist party and the Soviet Union in the democratic camp". They realised that they had not been vigilant enough towards the Yugoslav communist party. The month of June saw a new wave of retaliation against perceived supporters of Tito. On 10 June Koçi Xoxe was hanged in Albania and on 15 June, Rajk was arrested in Hungary. Another wave of attacks was carried out in the autumn of the same year, during which Rajk was hanged, Gomułka was arrested and Kostov's indictment was published. These attacks seem to have originated from the conflict between Tito and the Russians.

Fourth meeting 
Lastly, the fourth meeting was held in Hungary on 27 November 1949. Two reports were presented, which led to three resolutions. The Soviet delegate, Suslov, announced a report "on the Defence of Peace and the fight against warmongers", which urged the people of the Western countries to hinder any imperialist measures which were taken by the governments of said countries against the Eastern Block. Furthermore, Togliatti presented a report about the Working class and the tasks of the Communist and Workers parties. This resolution pinpointed the "particular attention which should be devoted to the mass of Catholic workers". Finally, the Romanian delegate, Gheorghiu-Dej, concluded that, as Tito's establishment had not been dealt with, it was the duty of the communist parties to strengthen the fight against it by making more noticeable the net of economic and diplomatic pressure and by urging Tito's opposition within Yugoslavia to start secret activity.

Press organ
The fortnightly journal For a Lasting Peace, for a People's Democracy! was published by the Cominform in Russian, French and English.

Member parties
Party of Labour of Albania
Bulgarian Communist Party
Communist Party of Czechoslovakia
French Communist Party
Socialist Unity Party of Germany
Hungarian Communist Party, then Hungarian Working People's Party
Italian Communist Party
Communist Party of the Netherlands
Polish Workers' Party, then Polish United Workers' Party
Romanian Workers' Party
Communist Party of the Soviet Union
Communist Party of Yugoslavia, until its expulsion in 1948.
Communist Party of the Free Territory of Trieste, until Yugoslavia's expulsion of 1948.

See also
Comintern
Comecon
Danube Commission
Warsaw Pact
World Marxist Review

Footnotes

Further reading

 G. Procacci (ed.), The Cominform. Minutes of the Three Conferences (1947-1949). Milan, Italy: Feltrinelli, 1994.

Political parties established in 1947
Political parties disestablished in 1956
Aftermath of World War II
Communist organizations
Stalinist organizations
Far-left politics
Left-wing internationals
Foreign relations of the Soviet Union
Eastern Bloc
Organizations based in Belgrade
1940s in Belgrade
Organizations based in Bucharest
1950s in Bucharest